"How Can I Refuse" is a song recorded by the rock band Heart. It was released in 1983 as the first single from the band's seventh studio album Passionworks.  The song is an uptempo rock tune which lyrically addresses the strong feelings of infatuation at the beginning of a romantic relationship.

"How Can I Refuse" was a successful album-oriented rock (AOR) hit, peaking at number one on the Billboard Top Rock Tracks chart, their only song to date to do so. The song also had moderate success on the pop charts, peaking at number forty-four on the Billboard Hot 100.

Cash Box called the song "good hard rock 'n' roll" and praised the energy level and vocal performance.

The song was Heart's first 12" single release in the UK, backed with "Barracuda" and "Little Queen".

Chart performance

See also
List of Billboard Mainstream Rock number-one songs of the 1980s

References

1983 singles
1983 songs
Heart (band) songs
Song recordings produced by Keith Olsen
Songs written by Nancy Wilson (rock musician)
Songs written by Ann Wilson
Songs written by Sue Ennis
Rock ballads